YUI Rich Text Editor is a project developed by Yahoo! as a part of the YUI Library for an online rich-text editor that replaces a standard HTML textarea. It allows for drag and drop inclusion and sizing of images, text coloring, realignment, fonts, italic and bold text. The YUI rich text editor uses a plug-in architecture and it is skinnable along with the rest of the YUI.

Components 
The YUI Rich Text Editor (RTE) contains the following components: Editor, SimpleEditor, ToolbarButton, and ToolbarButtonAdvanced. Some differences in the SimpleEditor and the Editor control are that the SimpleEditor uses JavaScript prompts and select elements rather than YUI defined elements.

History 
This component was designed and implemented by the Yahoo! developer Dav Glass in order to add a rich text editor component to the YUI.

References 

Free text editors
JavaScript-based HTML editors
Software using the BSD license